Bayside is a rural community in Charlotte County, New Brunswick, Canada. Bayside is located mainly on Route 127. Its shipping facilities are described under Charlotte County.

History

Notable people

See also
List of communities in New Brunswick

References

Communities in Charlotte County, New Brunswick
Designated places in New Brunswick
Local service districts of Charlotte County, New Brunswick